Leidy Glacier, is a glacier in northwestern Greenland. Administratively it belongs to the Avannaata municipality.

This glacier was named by Robert Peary after paleontologist, parasitologist, and anatomist Joseph Leidy (1823 – 1891), member of the Philadelphia Academy of Natural Sciences.

Geography 
The Leidy Glacier discharges from the Greenland Ice Sheet through the Academy Glacier.

The glacier flows roughly from SE to NW and, after forming an unusual cross pattern, it has its terminus at the head of the Academy Fjord to the northwest and, as the Marie Glacier, at the head of the Olrik Fjord to the southwest.

See also
List of glaciers in Greenland
Inglefield Fjord

References

External links
Identifying Spatial Variability in Greenland's Outlet Glacier Response to Ocean Heat
This Greenland Glacier Flows Like Water Around Rock - Gizmodo

Glaciers of Greenland